Mark Spain is a weekday television news anchor at WSET-TV in Lynchburg, Virginia. Formerly, Spain worked alongside Paige Kelton on Action News at WJAX-TV/WFOX-TV in Jacksonville, Florida, anchoring all evening newscasts (5, 5:30, 6, 11 on WJAX-TV and an hour-long 10 p.m. newscast on WFOX-TV).

Early life and education
Spain's career began as a paper carrier for The Cleveland Press, while he was still in junior high school. After graduating from high school, he worked for WVIZ- Public TV as he studied communications and received a BA from Cleveland State University.

Career
Before his move to the Florida television market, Spain worked in the Cleveland area television market, initially as a news reporter for WEWS-TV, the local ABC affiliate. He then later served as the 5:00 pm co-anchor with Macie Jepson at WJW-TV, the local Fox TV affiliate, from 1996-2000. He would also serve as a fill-in anchor/reporter for the 10:00 PM weekday and the weekend news broadcasts. He then moved on to the Jacksonville market in 2000, originally under the employment of First Coast News. While at FCN, Mark co-anchored First Coast News at 7. He resigned from his positions there in 2007, to anchor CBS 47 News at 6 and FOX 30 News at 10 at the then-WTEV and the then-WAWS respectively. He replaced Russell Motley. After the duopoly rebranded into one brand, Action News, Mark was promoted to anchoring all evening newscasts alongside Paige Kelton.  After a major News Department shakeup, Mark Spain, Paige Kelton's last broadcasts were on or about September 1, 2014.  Spain is now an anchor at Lynchburg, Virginia's WSET (TV). Spain now anchors the 5:30, 6, and 11pm weekday newscasts.

References

External links
 WSET Profile of Mark Spain

American television journalists
Television anchors from Jacksonville, Florida
Television anchors from Cleveland
Living people
African-American people
Cleveland State University alumni
American male journalists
Year of birth missing (living people)